Flight North is a 1986 West German-Finnish drama film directed by . It was entered into the 36th Berlin International Film Festival.

Cast
 Katharina Thalbach as Johanna
  as Ragnar
 Lena Olin as Karin
  as Jens
 Britta Pohland as Suse
 Käbi Laretei as Mother

References

External links

1986 films
1986 romantic drama films
Finnish romantic drama films
West German films
1980s German-language films
German romantic drama films
Films set in Finland
Films set in the 1930s
Films based on German novels
1980s German films